The Women's K-2 500 metres event was a pairs kayaking event conducted as part of the Canoeing at the 2000 Summer Olympics program.

Medalists

Results

Heats
13 crews entered in two heats. The top three finishers in each heat advanced to the final while the rest advanced to the semifinal.

Overall Results Heats

Semifinal
The top three finishers in the semifinal advanced to the final.

Final
The final was held on 1 October.

Fischer made history in this race in three ways. First, she became the first woman to win two or more medals in four Summer Olympics. Second, Fischer became the fourth woman to earn seven gold medals. Third, she joined American swimmer Jenny Thompson as the only non-gymnastics competitors to win ten medals in the Summer Olympics.

References
2000 Summer Olympics Canoe sprint results. 
Sports-reference.com 2000 women's K-2 500 m results.
Wallechinsky, David and Jaime Loucky (2008). "Canoeing: Women's Kayak Pairs 500 Meters". In The Complete Book of the Olympics: 2008 Edition. London: Aurum Press Limited. p. 494.

Women's K-2 500
Olympic
Women's events at the 2000 Summer Olympics